John Robinson (born 1620) was an English politician who sat in the House of Commons  in 1660.

Robinson was the second surviving son of William Robinson of Helston, Cornwall and his wife Catherine Penrose, daughter of Thomas Penrose of Sithney, Cornwall. He was baptised on  2 April 1620.

In 1660, Robinson was elected Member of Parliament for Liskeard in the Convention Parliament.

Robinson was probably unmarried. His brother Thomas was MP for Helston.

References

1620 births
Year of death missing
Members of the pre-1707 English Parliament for constituencies in Cornwall
Place of birth missing
People from Helston
English MPs 1660